Erfurt – Weimar – Weimarer Land II is an electoral constituency (German: Wahlkreis) represented in the Bundestag. It elects one member via first-past-the-post voting. Under the current constituency numbering system, it is designated as constituency 193. It is located in central Thuringia, comprising the cities of Erfurt and Weimar as well as the municipality of Grammetal from the Weimarer Land district.

Erfurt – Weimar – Weimarer Land II was created for the 2005 federal election. Since 2021, it has been represented by Carsten Schneider of the Social Democratic Party (SPD).

Geography
Erfurt – Weimar – Weimarer Land II is located in central Thuringia. As of the 2021 federal election, it comprises the independent cities of Erfurt and Weimar as well as the municipality of Grammetal from the Weimarer Land district.

History
Erfurt – Weimar – Weimarer Land II was created in 2005 and contained parts of the abolished constituencies of Erfurt and Jena – Weimar – Weimarer Land. In the 2005 election, it was constituency 194 in the numbering system. Since the 2009 election, it has been number 193. Its borders have not changed since its creation.

Members
The constituency was first represented by Carsten Schneider of the Social Democratic Party (SPD) from 2005 to 2009. Antje Tillmann of the Christian Democratic Union (CDU) was elected in 2009, and re-elected in 2013 and 2017. Former member Schneider regained it for the SPD in 2021.

Election results

2021 election

2017 election

2013 election

2009 election

References

Federal electoral districts in Thuringia
2005 establishments in Germany
Constituencies established in 2005
Erfurt
Weimar
Weimarer Land